USS Prince William (CVE-31) (originally AVG-31, later ACV-31), ex-MC Hull 242, was laid down by the Seattle-Tacoma Shipbuilding Corporation of Tacoma, Washington, 18 May 1942 as AVG-31; redesignated ACV-31 on 20 August 1942; launched 23 August 1942; sponsored by Mrs. Paul Foley; and commissioned 9 April 1943, Captain Herbert E. Regan in command. The ship was named after Prince William Sound, Alaska.

Service history
Following an abbreviated shakedown off the west coast, Prince William reported for duty with the Pacific Fleet’s air arm to ferry planes and transport personnel to forward areas. Redesignated CVE-31 on 15 July 1943, she operated between the west coast and such places as New Caledonia, Canton Island, Samoa and Espiritu Santo until the spring of 1944.

Then, a brief assignment at San Diego, training and qualifying pilots, preceded her return to ferrying duties in mid-April 1944. She completed a run to Townsville, Australia, 7 May 1944, and, on her return to San Diego, was reassigned to the Atlantic Fleet. Unloading aircraft and cargo at Port Everglades, Florida, 21 June 1944, she continued on to Norfolk where new navigational equipment (LORAN) was installed. During July and into August, she qualified pilots in the Chesapeake Bay area, then, on 24 August 1944 , resumed plane and personnel ferry services with a run to Casablanca. Returning with worn airplane engines and parts, she moored at Norfolk 26 September 1944 for availability. Prince William returned to training duties in mid-October 1944.

Until 26 January 1945, she qualified pilots in the Narrangansett Bay area, then shifted to Key West. There she continued to carry out her mission as a training carrier until returning to Norfolk in May. On 2 June 1945, the CVE got underway for the Panama Canal and on the 8th rejoined the Pacific Fleet. Again assigned to ferrying duties, she transported planes and personnel between the west coast and Hawaii for the remainder of World War II.

After the cessation of hostilities, Prince William was assigned to “Magic Carpet” duty and for the next seven months returned military personnel and equipment to the United States. Completing her last run at San Diego, 21 March 1946, she was ordered to the Atlantic Reserve Fleet and on 8 April 1946 got underway for the Panama Canal. Arriving at Norfolk on 23 April 1946, she continued on, two days later, to Philadelphia where she decommissioned 29 August 1946.

Reclassified CVHE-31, 12 June 1955, Prince William remained a unit of the Philadelphia Group, Atlantic Reserve Fleet until struck from the Naval Register 1 March 1959. She was sold for scrap in Japan in March 1961.

References

External links
 Photo gallery at navsource.org

 

Bogue-class escort carriers of the United States Navy
Ships built in Tacoma, Washington
1942 ships
World War II escort aircraft carriers of the United States